The 2019–20 season was Elche 96th competitive season the club's history. During this season, the club have competed in Segunda División, and the Copa del Rey. The season covered a period from 1 July 2019 to 23 August 2020.

Squad
.

Reserve team

Out on loan

Current technical staff

Pre-season and friendlies

Competitions

Overview

Segunda División

League table

Results summary

Results by round

Matches
The fixtures were revealed on 4 July 2019.

Play-offs

Copa del Rey

References

External links
Official website 
Soccerway team profile
Betexplorer team profile
Worldfootball team profile
Futbolme team profile 
BDFutbol team profile

Elche CF seasons
Elche